Hope Clarke (born March 23, 1941) is an American actress, dancer, vocalist, choreographer, and director. Clarke performed as principal dancer with the Katherine Dunham Company and the Alvin Ailey American Dance Theater, 1960s; actress on stage, film, and television, 1970s–1980s; choreographer and director, 1980s--.  Clarke served on the Tony Awards Nominating Committee for the 2011–12 Broadway season. Clarke made history in 1995 when she became the first African American, as well as the first African-American woman, to direct and choreograph a major staging of the opera-musical Porgy and Bess. Clarke's production of the George Gershwin classic was staged in celebration of the work's 60h anniversary, and it toured not only major American cities but Japan and Europe as well. Clarke drew critical acclaim for her commitment to staging the show as a monument to African-American community and pride, giving a more hopeful, positive aura to a story that has been criticized for its stereotypes. As for the director herself, the success of Porgy and Bess is just the latest accolade in a long career devoted to dance and drama.

Biography

Early life and career
A native of Washington, D.C., Clarke grew up in just the sort of community she sought to portray in Porgy and Bess. Segregation was still a harsh fact of life during her childhood. She recalled, for instance, how people shopped through mail-order catalogues in order to purchase clothes offered in stores where they were not welcome. "The black community, as I remember it, was very closely knit," Clarke said in the San Francisco Examiner: "Before the fabric of this society was torn by racism and lack of education, we all took care of each other. We all watched each other's children." In 1960, the still-teenaged Clarke landed a role in the original touring cast of West Side Story, a musical play about rival big city gangs. Following West Side Story, Clarke served as a principal dancer in two noted African-American dance troupes: the Katherine Dunham Company and the Alvin Ailey American Dance Theater. She was particularly prominent in the Alvin Ailey company and sometimes danced in partnership with Ailey himself. Clarke told Essence magazine that her years as a professional dancer helped her to prepare for the next stages in her career: "The discipline I learned in dance carried over into acting and directing," she said.

Career

Stage and acting
On Broadway, Clarke, who was also raised in New York City, appeared in West Side Story (1960), Hallelujah, Baby! (1967), Don't Bother Me, I Can't Cope (1972), and Grind (1975), and choreographed Jelly's Last Jam (1992), for which she was nominated for a Tony and Drama Desk Award, and Caroline, or Change (2004). After leaving the Alvin Ailey group in the 1970s, Clarke moved into film and television acting. Her most notable feature film performance may be A Piece of the Action (1977). She also appeared in guest roles on episodes of numerous television drama and comedy series, including The Jeffersons, The Ropers, Hill Street Blues, Three's Company, and As the World Turns. She also appeared in the NBC-TV miniseries King (1978), which was based upon the life and ministry of the slain civil rights leader Martin Luther King Jr., and appeared in the television film Seventeen Again (2000).

Choreography
After years as a dancer, Clarke was often called in to choreograph various stage and television shows. Besides, she joked in Essence, "I had bills to pay." Clarke found ample opportunities to develop her choreographic skills, working in America and abroad. She worked for the New York City-based Opera Ebony, helping to produce Porgy and Bess in such diverse venues as Brazil and Finland. She earned a Tony Award nomination for choreography for her work in the 1992 Broadway hit Jelly's Last Jam. Clarke choreographed projects as diverse as Dorothy Rudd Moore's Freedom and Wolfgang Amadeus Mozart's Così fan tutte. All of these efforts helped to bring Clarke to the attention of opera and musical theater executives. One of them was David Gockley, general director of the Houston Grand Opera. Gockley had decided to create a whole new touring production of Porgy and Bess, and wanted an African-American director for the project. Clarke was hired, telling the Minneapolis Star Tribune: "I've worked through the ranks, and I was ready for this." Interviewed about the project in the San Diego Union-Tribune, Clarke stated:
"As a director, I guess I bring in the female sensibilities. Since I'm also an actress, I've really tried to develop the characterizations so that the performers don't do a little singing here, and some acting there. And coming from a black perspective, I know how we think, how we feel, what we do. I understand the little things. That makes a difference."

Porgy and Bess (1995) Houston/Dallas Opera production
Clarke brought some new touches to the Porgy and Bess story, which was written by white composer George Gershwin for an all-black cast. The story, set in a fictitious Charleston, South Carolina neighborhood called Catfish Row, revolves around a crippled beggar named Porgy, a sensuous woman named Bess, and two troublemakers, Crown and Sporting Life. Though Gershwin's score has always been highly popular, especially the ballad "Summertime", the characters and setting have drawn criticism for portraying African Americans in stereotypical ways. For example, Porgy begs for money, Bess takes lovers, Sporting Life sells drugs, and Crown is a murderer.

Although Clarke knew that she could not tamper with the essential plot and characterizations in the play, she still, nevertheless had several ideas about how to present the residents of Catfish Row in a more favorable light. She conceived her production of Porgy and Bess as a celebration of the lives of Charleston-based Gullahs, an African-American community believed to be Angolan in origin. Critic Kenneth Herman noted in the Los Angeles Times, "Clarke ... fleshed out the opera's Gullah context, using that culture's integrity to compensate for some of the lead characters' moral defects. She ... also made certain the cast knows how to pronounce Gullah dialect, which the opera's libretto employs."

Clarke was well aware that she was making history both by serving as director of a large-scale production and by her artistic decisions about the show. She told the Los Angeles Times: "I want African Americans who come to see the opera to be proud that an African American is directing ... and to recognize the people on stage. I wanted to draw a community which we could find today: It could be any poor community, but one with pride." She expanded upon this philosophy in Opera News: "In my production, everybody works. Everybody has some type of job. Just because you are poor doesn't mean you have to be slovenly or ignorant." Clarke's staging of Porgy and Bess toured several major American cities, including San Diego, Los Angeles, San Francisco, Houston, and Minneapolis. It also played engagements in Japan and at Italy's famed La Scala opera house in Milan. Clarke received a Tony Award for her work on Porgy and Bess.

Clarke kept a full schedule in New York City and elsewhere, choreographing various plays and musicals. It is felt that, through her successes, she was able to pave the way for other talented artists. In her 1995 interview in Essence, Clarke stated: "Blacks and women have been locked out of directing major productions for too long. It's time for us not only to tell our stories but to direct them."

Film and TV filmography

 Change of Mind (1969) .... Nancy
 Going Home (1971) .... Mother at prison
 Book of Numbers (1973) .... Pigmeat Goins
 A Piece of the Action (1977) .... Sarah Thomas
 The Jeffersons .... Sherry Barnes (1 episode, 1977)
 King (1978) TV mini-series .... Mary (unknown episodes)
 Good Times .... Brenda Gordon (1 episode, 1978)
 What's Happening!! .... Elizabeth Duncan /Mrs.Watson ... (2 episodes, 1977–1978)
 Jennifer: A Woman's Story (1979) (TV) .... Annie (secretary)
 The Ropers .... Dr. Young (1 episode, 1979)
 Hart to Hart.... Teacher (1 episode, 1979)
 Three's Company .... Second Nurse (1 episode, 1979)
 The White Shadow .... Aunt Edna Heyward (1 episode, 1979)
 Scout's Honor (1980) (TV)
 Body and Soul (1981) Choreographer
 Maggie (TV).... Receptionist (1 episode, 1981)
 Lois Gibbs and the Love Canal (1982) (TV) .... Chris
 Hill Street Blues .... Mrs. Reese (1 episode, 1982)
 The New Odd Couple .... Beth St. Clair (1 episode, 1983)
 Beat Street (1984) .... Dancing Instructor
 Into the Night (1985/I) .... Airport Cop
 Amen .... Carol Wilson (1 episode, 1987)
 Angel Heart (1987) .... Voodoo Dancer
 A Father's Homecoming (1988) (TV) .... Doctor
 Basquiat (1996) .... Matilde
 New York Undercover (TV)... Marilyn Farris (1 episode, 1996)
 Law & Order (TV).. Mrs. Marbury/Appellate Judge #2/Judge Emma Reynolds ... (3 episodes, 1996–2002)
 Seventeen Again (2000) .... Grandma Catherine "Cat" Donovan
 Driving Fish (2002) .... Betty
 "Sex and the City (2002)...Lee
 Men Without (2004) .... Ms. Jackson
 ShowBusiness: The Road to Broadway (2007) .... Herself

Stage credits

 West Side Story [revival, musical, drama]
Performer / April 27, 1960 – December 10, 1960
 Kwamina (original, musical)
Performer, Dancer / October 23, 1961 – November 18, 1961 
 Hallelujah, Baby! (original, musical)
Performer / April 26, 1967 – January 13, 1968 
 Don't Bother Me, I Can't Cope (original, musical, revue, all-Black cast)
Performer / April 19, 1972 – October 27, 1974 
 Grind (original, musical)
Performer [Ruby] / April 16, 1985 – June 22, 1985 
 Jelly's Last Jam (original, musical)
Choreographer / April 26, 1992 – September 5, 1993 
nominated for a Tony and Drama Desk Award
 Porgy And Bess (revival, musical, drama)
Director and Choreographer / 1995
 The Tempest (revival, play, comedy)
Choreographer / November 1, 1995 – December 31, 1995 
 Caroline, or Change (original, musical, drama)
Choreographer / May 2, 2004 – August 29, 2004 
 ShowBusiness: The Road to Broadway (2007) .... Herself
 A Free Man of Color
Choreographer / (November 18, 2010 – January 9, 2011)
 Porgy & Bess
Director / (March 29, 2012 – April 1, 2012)

Awards and recognition
 1993 - Tony Award (nominated) – for choreography in Jelly's Last Jam
 1995 - Tony Award (won) – for directing Porgy and Bess.

References

 "It's Summertime, and the Staging Ain't Easy ... : Opera: Hope Clarke is unhappy that her work on 'Porgy and Bess' is being modified before its area visit. But the Houston Opera's general director counters that 'it's not a new staging'", Los Angeles Times, June 1, 1995, p. F1.
 Star Tribune (Minneapolis, MN), April 23, 1995, p. F1; April 28, 1995, p. E4.

External links 

 "Hope Clarke Theatre Credits", BroadwayWorld.com

African-American female dancers
American female dancers
African-American dancers
20th-century African-American women singers
American choreographers
1941 births
Living people
Actresses from Washington, D.C.
African-American actresses
20th-century American actresses
American television actresses
Dancers from Washington, D.C.
Singers from Washington, D.C.
21st-century African-American people
21st-century African-American women